Guglielmo Andreoli is the name of two brothers:

 Guglielmo Andreoli the Elder (1835–1860), Italian pianist
 Guglielmo Andreoli the Younger (1862–1932), Italian pianist, teacher, and composer